Taras Hryhorovych Shevchenko (pronounced  without the middle name;  – ), also known as Kobzar Taras, or simply Kobzar (a kobzar is a bard in Ukrainian culture), was a Ukrainian poet, Russian writer, artist, public and political figure, folklorist and ethnographer. His literary heritage is regarded to be the foundation of modern Ukrainian literature and, to a large extent, the modern Ukrainian language, though this is different from the language of his poems. He also wrote some works in Russian (nine novellas, a diary, and an autobiography). Shevchenko is also known for his many masterpieces as a painter and an illustrator.

He was a fellow of the Imperial Academy of Arts. Though he had never been a member of the Brotherhood of Saints Cyril and Methodius, Shevchenko was convicted in 1847 of explicitly promoting the independence of Ukraine, writing poems in the Ukrainian language and ridiculing members of the Russian Imperial House. Contrary to the members of the society who did not understand that their activity led to the idea of an independent Ukraine, according to the secret police, he was a champion of independence.

Life

Childhood and youth
He was the third child after his sister Kateryna and brother Mykyta, in family of serf peasants Hryhoriy Ivanovych Shevchenko (1782?–1825) and Kateryna Yakymivna Shevchenko (Boiko) (1782? – 6 August 1823), both of whom were owned by landlord Vasily Engelhardt. According to the family legends, Taras's forefathers were Cossacks who served in the Zaporozhian Host and had taken part in the Cossack uprisings of the 17th and 18th centuries. Those uprisings were brutally suppressed in Cherkasy, Poltava, Kiev, Bratslav and Chernigov, disrupting normal social life for many years afterwards. Most of the local population were then enslaved and reduced to poverty.

In 1816, the Shevchenko family moved back to the village of Kyrylivka (today Shevchenkove) in Zvenyhorodka county, where Taras' father, Hryhoriy Ivanovych, had been born. Taras spent his childhood years in the village. On , Taras' sister Yaryna was born, and on —Maria. Once, young Taras went looking for "the iron pillars that hold up the sky" and got lost. Chumaks who met the boy took him with them to Kyrylivka. On  Taras' brother Yosyp was born.

In the fall of 1822, Taras started to take grammar classes at a local precentor (dyak) Sovhyr. At that time, Shevchenko became familiar with Hryhoriy Skovoroda's works. During 1822-1828 Shevchenko painted horses and soldiers.

On  his older sister and nanny Kateryna married Anton Krasytskyi, a serf "from Zelena Dibrova". On  Taras' hard working mother died, leaving six children - three sons and three daughters, including the just-married eldest. Only a month later, on  his father married a widow, Oksana Tereshchenko, a native of Moryntsi village, who already had three children of her own. She treated her step-children, and particularly little Taras, with great cruelty. On  Taras's half-sister Maria from the second marriage of Hryhoriy Ivanovych was born. In 1824, Taras, along with his father, became a traveling merchant (chumak) and traveled to Zvenyhorodka, Uman, Yelizavetgrad (today Kropyvnytskyi). 

Soon his stepmother, along with her children, returned to Moryntsi.

Taras was sent to work for precentor (dyak) Bohorsky who had just arrived from Kiev in 1824. As an apprentice, Taras carried water, heated up a school, served the precentor, read psalms over the dead and continued to study. At that time Shevchenko became familiar with some works of Ukrainian literature. Soon, tired of Bohorsky's long term mistreatment, Shevchenko escaped in search of a painting master in the surrounding villages. For several days he worked for deacon Yefrem in Lysianka, later in other places around in southern part of Kiev Governorate (villages Stebliv and Tarasivka). In 1827 Shevchenko was herding community sheep near his village. He then met Oksana Kovalenko, a childhood friend, whom Shevchenko mentions in his works on multiple occasions. He dedicated the introduction of his poem "Mariana, the Nun" to her.

As a hireling for the Kyrylivka priest Hryhoriy Koshytsia, Taras was visiting Bohuslav where he drove the priest's son to school, while also taking apples and plums to market. At the same time, he was driving to markets in the towns of Burty and Shpola. In 1828, Shevchenko was hired as a serving boy to a lord's court in Vilshana and obtained permission there to study with a local artist. 

When Taras was 14, Vasily Engelhardt died and the village of Kyrylivka and all its people became a property of his son, Pavlo Engelhardt. Shevchenko was turned into a court servant of his new master at the Vilshana estates. On  Pavlo Engelgardt caught Shevchenko at night painting a portrait of Cossack Matvii Platov, a hero of the Patriotic War of 1812. He boxed the ears of the boy and ordered him to be whipped in the stables with rods. During 1829–1833 Taras copied paintings of Suzdal masters.

For almost two and a half years, from fall of 1828 to start of 1831, Shevchenko stayed with his master in Vilno (Vilnius). Details of the travel are not well known. Perhaps, there he attended lectures by painting professor Jan Rustem at the University of Vilnius. In the same city, Shevchenko could also have witnessed the November Uprising of 1830. From those times, Shevchenko's painting "Bust of a Woman" survived. It indicates almost professional handling of the pencil.

In 1831, Engelgardt moved from Vilno to Saint Petersburg and took Shevchenko along with him. To benefit from the art works (since it was prestigious to have one's own "chamber artist"), Engelgardt sent Shevchenko to painter Vasiliy Shiriayev for four-year study. From that point and until 1838 Shevchenko lived in the Khrestovskyi building (today Zahorodnii prospekt, 8) where Shiriayev rented an apartment. In his free time at night, Shevchenko visited the Summer Garden where he portrayed statues. In Saint Petersburg he also started writing his poems.

In 1833 Shevchenko painted a portrait of his master Pavlo Engelgardt (National Museum Taras Shevchenko).

In his novel "Artist" Shevchenko described that during the pre-academical period he painted such works as "Apollo Belvedere", "Fraklete", "Heraclitus", "Architectural barelief", "Mask of Fortune". He participated in painting of the Big Theatre as artist apprentice. He created a composition "Alexander of Macedon shows trust towards his doctor Philip". The drawing was created for a contest of the Imperial Academy of Arts, announced in 1830.

Out of serfdom
In Saint Petersburg Shevchenko met Ukrainian artist Ivan Soshenko, who introduced him to other compatriots such as Yevhen Hrebinka and Vasyl Hryhorovych, and to Russian painter Alexey Venetsianov. Through these men Shevchenko also met famous painter and professor Karl Briullov, who donated his portrait of Russian poet Vasily Zhukovsky as a lottery prize. Its proceeds were used to buy Shevchenko's freedom on 5 May 1838.

First successes

Shevchenko was accepted as a student into the Academy of Arts in the workshop of Karl Briullov in the same year. The following year he became a resident student at the Association for the Encouragement of Artists. During annual examinations at the Imperial Academy of Arts, Shevchenko won the silver medal for landscape painting. In 1840 he again received the silver medal, this time for his first oil painting, The Beggar Boy Giving Bread to a Dog.

Shevchenko began writing poetry while still being a serf, and in 1840 his first collection of poetry, Kobzar,  was published. According to Ivan Franko, a renowned Ukrainian poet in the generation after Shevchenko, "[Kobzar] was "a new world of poetry. It burst forth like a spring of clear, cold water, and sparkled with a clarity, breadth, and elegance of artistic expression not previously known in Ukrainian writing".

In 1841, the epic poem Haidamaky was released. In September 1841, Shevchenko was awarded his third silver medal for The Gypsy Fortune Teller. Shevchenko also wrote plays. In 1842, he released a part of the tragedy Mykyta Haidai and in 1843 he completed the drama Nazar Stodolia.

While residing in Saint Petersburg, Shevchenko made three trips to Ukraine, in 1843, 1845, and 1846. The difficult conditions Ukrainians had made a profound impact on the poet-painter. Shevchenko visited his siblings, still enserfed, and other relatives. He met with prominent Ukrainian writers and intellectuals Yevhen Hrebinka, Panteleimon Kulish, and Mykhaylo Maksymovych, and was befriended by the princely Repnin family, especially Varvara.

In 1844, distressed by the condition of Ukrainian regions in the Russian Empire, Shevchenko decided to capture some of his homeland's historical ruins and cultural monuments in an album of etchings, which he called Picturesque Ukraine. Only the first six etchings were printed because of the lack of means to continue.
An album of watercolors from historical places and pencil drawings was done in 1845.

Exile

On 22 March 1845, the Council of the Academy of Arts granted Shevchenko the title of a non-classed artist. He again traveled to Ukraine where he met with historian Mykola Kostomarov and other members of the Brotherhood of Saints Cyril and Methodius, a clandestine society also known as Ukrainian-Slavic society and dedicated to the political liberalization of the Empire and its transformation into a federation-like polity of Slavic nations. Upon the society's suppression by the authorities, Shevchenko's wrote a poem "Dream", that was confiscated from the society's members and became one of the major issues of the scandal.

Shevchenko was arrested together with the members of the society on 5 April 1847. Tsar Nicholas I read Shevchenko's poem, "Dream". Vissarion Belinsky wrote in his memoirs that, Nicholas I, knowing Ukrainian very well, laughed and chuckled whilst reading the section about himself, but his mood quickly turned to bitter hatred when he read about his wife. Shevchenko had mocked her frumpy appearance and facial tics, which she had developed fearing the Decembrist Uprising and its plans to kill her family. After reading this section the Tsar indignantly stated "I suppose he had reasons not to be on terms with me, but what has she done to deserve this?" In the official report of Orlov Shevchenko was accused of composing poetry in "Little-Russian language" (archaic Russian name for Ukrainian language)  of outrageous content. Instead of being grateful to be redeemed out of serfdom. In the report, Orlov listed the crimes as advocating and inspiring Ukrainian nationalists, alleging enslavement and misfortune of Ukraine, glorified the Hetman Administration (Cossack Hetmanate) and Cossack liberties and "with incredible audacity poured slander and bile on persons of Imperial House".

While under investigation, Shevchenko was imprisoned in Saint Petersburg in casemates of the 3rd Department of Imperial Chancellery on Panteleimonovskaya Street (today Pestelia str., 9). After being convicted, he was exiled as a private to the Russian military garrison in Orenburg at Orsk, near the Ural Mountains. Tsar Nicholas I, personally confirmed his sentence, added to it, "Under the strictest surveillance, without the right to write or paint." He was subsequently sent on a forced march from Saint Petersburg to Orenburg and Orsk.

Next year in 1848, he was assigned to undertake the first Russian naval expedition of the Aral Sea on the ship "Konstantin", under the command of Lieutenant Butakov. Although officially a common private, Shevchenko was effectively treated as an equal by the other members of the expedition. He was tasked to sketch various landscapes around the coast of the Aral Sea. After an 18-month voyage (1848–49) Shevchenko returned with his album of drawings and paintings to Orenburg. Most of those drawings were created for a detailed account of the expedition. Nevertheless, Shevchenko created many unique works of art about the Aral Sea nature and Kazakhstan people at a time when Russian conquest of Central Asia had begun in the middle of the nineteenth century.
 
He was then sent to one of the worst penal settlements, the remote fortress of Novopetrovsk at Mangyshlak Peninsula, where he spent seven terrible years. In 1851, at the suggestion of fellow serviceman Bronisław Zaleski, lieutenant colonel Mayevsky assigned him to the Mangyshlak (Karatau) geological expedition. In 1857 Shevchenko finally returned from exile after receiving amnesty from a new emperor, though he was not permitted to return to St. Petersburg and was forced to stay in Nizhniy Novgorod.

Shevchenko was eventually allowed to return to St. Petersburg. In the winter of 1858, he saw African-American Shakespearean actor Ira Aldridge perform with his troupe. Using translators, the two became good friends over discussions of art and music and their shared experiences of oppression. Shevchenko drew Aldridge's portrait. Aldridge was later gifted a portrait of Shevchenko by Mikhail Mikeshin.

In May 1859, Shevchenko got permission to return to Ukraine. He intended to buy a plot of land close to the village Pekari. In July, he was again arrested on a charge of blasphemy, but then released and ordered to return to St. Petersburg.

Death
Taras Shevchenko spent the last years of his life working on new poetry, paintings, and engravings, as well as editing his older works.  After difficult years in exile, however, his illnesses took their toll upon him. Shevchenko died in Saint Petersburg on 10 March 1861.

He was first buried at the Smolensk Cemetery in Saint Petersburg. However, fulfilling Shevchenko's wish, expressed in his poem "Testament" ("Zapovit"), to be buried in Ukraine, his friends arranged the transfer of his remains by train to Moscow and then by horse-drawn wagon to his homeland. Shevchenko was re-buried on 8 May on the Chernecha hora (Monk's Hill; today Taras Hill) near the Dnipro River and Kaniv. A tall mound was erected over his grave, now a memorial part of the Kaniv Museum-Preserve.

Dogged by terrible misfortune in love and life, the poet died seven days before the 1861 emancipation of serfs was announced. His works and life are revered by Ukrainians throughout the world and his impact on Ukrainian literature is immense.

Poetic works

237 poems were written by Taras Shevchenko but only 28 of these were published in the Russian Empire and the other 6 in the Austrian Empire over his lifetime.

Example of poetry: "Testament" (Zapovit)
Shevchenko's  "Testament", (Zapovit, 1845), has been translated into more than 150 languages and set to music in the 1870s by H. Hladky.

Artwork

835 works survived into modern times in original form and partly in prints engraved on metal and wood by Russian and other foreign engravers, while some works survived as copies done by painters while Shevchenko still lived. There is data on over 270 more works that were lost and have not been found yet. Painted and engraved works at the time of completion are dated 1830-1861 and are territorially related to Ukraine, Russia, and Kazakhstan. The genres are - portraits, compositions on mythological, historical, and household themes, architectural landscapes, and scenery. The techniques used for that were oil painting on canvas, watercolor, sepia, inking, lead pencil, as well as etching on separate sheets of white, colored and tinted paper of different sizes and in five albums. A significant part of Shevchenko's artistic heritage consists of completed paintings, however, there are also sketches, etudes, and outlines which are no less valuable for understanding Shevchenko's methods and artistic path. Of all Shevchenko's paintings, only a small part has any authorial signatures or inscriptions and an even a smaller part has dated.

Family
Shevchenko never married. He had six siblings and at least three step-siblings, of whom only Stepan Tereshchenko (1820?–unknown) is known. Some sources connect him to the Tereshchenko family of Ukrainian industrialists.
 Kateryna Hryhorivna Krasytska (Shevchenko) (1806–1850) married Anton Hryhorovych Krasytsky (1794–1848)
 Yakym Krasytsky
 Maksym Krasytsky (unknown–1910)
 Stepan Krasytsky
 Fedora Krasytska (1824?–unknown), known painter
 Mykyta Hryhorovych Shevchenko (1811–1870?)
 Iryna Kovtun (Shevchenko)
 Prokop Shevchenko
 Petro Shevchenko (1847–1944?)
 Maria Hryhorivna Shevchenko (1814?–unknown) (His twin sister)
 Yaryna Hryhorivna Boiko (Shevchenko) (1816–1865) married Fedir Kondratievych Boiko (1811–1850)
 Maryna Boiko
 Ustyna Boiko (1836–unknown)
 Illarion Boiko (1840–unknown)
 Lohvyn Boiko (1842–unknown)
 Ivan Boiko (1845–unknown)
 Lavrentiy Boiko (1847–unknown)
 Maria Hryhorivna Shevchenko (1819–1846)
 Yosyp Hryhorovych Shevchenko (1821–1878) married Matrona Hryhorivna Shevchenko (1820?–unknown), a distant relative
 Andriy Shevchenko
 Ivan Shevchenko
 Trokhym Shevchenko (20 September 1843 – unknown)

Heritage and legacy

Impact
Taras Shevchenko's writings formed the foundation for the modern Ukrainian literature to a degree that he is also considered the founder of the modern written Ukrainian language (although Ivan Kotlyarevsky pioneered the literary work in what was close to the modern Ukrainian in the end of the 18th century). Shevchenko's poetry contributed greatly to the growth of Ukrainian national consciousness, and his influence on various facets of Ukrainian intellectual, literary, and national life is still felt to this day. Influenced by Romanticism, Shevchenko managed to find his own manner of poetic expression that encompassed themes and ideas germane to Ukraine and his personal vision of its past and future.

In view of his literary importance, the impact of his artistic work is often missed, although his contemporaries valued his artistic work no less, or perhaps even more than his literary work. A great number of his pictures, drawings, and etchings preserved to this day testify to his unique artistic talent. He also experimented with photography and it is little known that Shevchenko may be considered to have pioneered the art of etching in the Russian Empire (in 1860 he was awarded the title of Academician in the Imperial Academy of Arts specifically for his achievements in etching.)

His influence on Ukrainian culture has been so immense, that even during Soviet times, the official position was to downplay strong Ukrainian nationalism expressed in his poetry, suppressing any mention of it, and to put an emphasis on the social and anti-Tsarist aspects of his legacy, the Class struggle within the Russian Empire. Shevchenko, who himself was born a serf and suffered tremendously for his political views in opposition to the established order of the Empire, was presented in the Soviet times as an internationalist who stood up in general for the plight of the poor classes exploited by the reactionary political regime rather than the vocal proponent of the Ukrainian national idea.

This view is significantly revised in modern independent Ukraine, where he is now viewed as almost an iconic figure with unmatched significance for the Ukrainian nation, a view that has been mostly shared all along by the Ukrainian diaspora that has always revered Shevchenko.

He inspired some of the protestors during the Euromaidan. The context of his poem "Testament" (Zapovit) was given credit of "resonating" with Ukraine's ongoing struggle during the invasion from Russia in 2022.

Monuments and memorials

There are many monuments to Shevchenko throughout Ukraine, most notably at his memorial in Kaniv and in the center of Kyiv, just across from the Kyiv University that bears his name. The Kyiv Metro station, Tarasa Shevchenka, is also dedicated to Shevchenko. Among other notable monuments to the poet located throughout Ukraine are the ones in Kharkiv (in front of Shevchenko Park), Lviv, Luhansk and many others.

The first statues of Shevchenko were erected in the Soviet Union as part of their Ukrainization-policies. The first one was revealed in Romny on 27 October 1918 when the city was located in the Ukrainian state. The following were erected in Moscow (29 November 1918) and Petrograd (1 December 1918). The monuments in Moscow and Petrograd did not survive because they were made of inferior materials. The concrete statue in Romny also began to decay, but was remade in bronze and re-unveiled in 1982. The original Romny statue is currently located in Kyiv's Andriyivskyy Descent.

Ukrainian composer Tamara Maliukova Sidorenko (1919-2005) set several of Shevchenko’s poems to music. In 1957, upon the request of the Taras Shevchenko Scientific Society to write a symphonic work on the words of Shevchenko's "Message" ("To both the dead and the living ...") for the centenary of the poet's death, the Ukrainian-American composer Antin Rudnytsky (1902˗1975) wrote the symphonic cantata "Poslaniie" on Shevchenko's poem of the same title.	 

From 1966 to 1968 artist Hanna Veres made a series of ornamental textiles, dedicated to Taras Shevchenko. The 1971 edition of Shevchenko's Kobzar is illustrated with reproductions of them, co-produced with Anna Vasylashchuk (uk).

After Ukraine gained its independence in the wake of the 1991 Soviet Collapse, some Ukrainian cities replaced their statues of Lenin with statues of Taras Shevchenko and in some locations that lacked streets named to him, local authorities renamed the streets or squares to Shevchenko. There is also a bilingual Taras Shevchenko high school in Sighetu Marmatiei, Romania.

Although Russia invaded Ukraine on February 24, 2022, there is still a monument erected in his name in the city of Saint Petersburg, which was rebuilt with the new materials, replacing the old one in 2000.

Outside of Ukraine and the former USSR, monuments to Shevchenko have been put up in many countries, usually under the initiative of local Ukrainian diasporas. There are several memorial societies and monuments to him throughout Canada and the United States, most notably the monument in Washington, D.C., near Dupont Circle. The granite monument was carved by Vincent Illuzzi of Barre, Vermont. The Washington, D.C. monument was designed by Ukrainian Canadian sculptor Leo Mol & architect Radoslav Zhuk. There is also a monument in Soyuzivka in New York State,  Tipperary Hill in Syracuse, New York, a park is named after him in Elmira Heights, N.Y. and a street is named after him in New York City's East Village. There is also a Taras Shevchenko Park in Northeast Philadelphia, Pennsylvania. A section of Connecticut Route 9 that goes through New Britain is also named after Shevchenko. In Brazil there are statues of Taras Shevchenko in Curitiba, at Ukraine Square, and in Prudentópolis, 80% of whose population is of Ukrainian descent. A monument to Shevchenko was put up in Zagreb, Croatia on May 21, 2015. 
In Paris, off of Boulevard Saint Germain, there is square Taras Chevchenko, with a bronze bust by Lysenko. 

There is also a statue of Taras Shevchenko in the central park near the St. Krikor Lusavorich Cathedral in Yerevan, Armenia.
There is a bust of Taras Shevchenko in the Ukrainian Cultural Garden in Rockefeller Park, Cleveland, Ohio, United States.

There is a bust of Shevchenko in the Østre Anlæg park in Copenhagen, Denmark. A gift from the Danish-Ukrainian Society, it was designed by Sergei Boguslavsky and unveiled on 24 September 2010, making it the first in Scandnavia and North-Western Europe.

Gallery

See also
 Legacy of Taras Shevchenko
 List of things named after Taras Shevchenko
 Taras Shevchenko Place, a street in New York City
 Izbornyk, contains collection of his works (free access)
 Shevchenko National Prize, Ukrainian State literary and artistic award
 Shevchenko Park (disambiguation)

Footnotes

a.  At the time of birth of Taras Shevchenko, the parish register of the village of Moryntsi was in Russian (the official language of the Russian Empire), and he was recorded as Taras (""). At that time serfs' patronymic names were not identified in documents (for example, see text of a "free-to-go" document from 22 April 1838: ""). During Shevchenko's lifetime in Ukrainian texts two variants were used: "" (see the letter of Hryhory Kvitka-Osnovyanenko from October 23, 1840: "") and "" (the letter of same author from April 29, 1842: ""). In Russian it is accepted to write «Тарас Григорьевич Шевченко», in Ukrainian—«Тарас Григорович Шевченко», in other languages—transliterating from the Ukrainian name, for example "Taras Hryhorovich Shevchenko.
b.  Note #10 in the parish register of Moryntsi for 1814 (preserved in the Shevchenko National Museum in Kyiv): ""
c.  This episode is described in the Taras Shevchenko's novel Princess. It is also retold by Oleksandr Konysky in his book Taras Shevchenko-Hrushivsky, claiming that the first who told the story of "iron pillars" was Oleksandr Lazarevsky.
d.  Parish register of the village of Moryntsi for 1823, note #16. Preserved at the Shevchenko National Museum in Kyiv.
e.  See article on Oksana Antonivna Tereshchenko in the Shevchenko dictionary.

References

Further reading
 Magazine Osnova, 1862.
 Cherkasy Regional Archives.
 Magazine Kyivan Past, 1882.
 Magazine "Odesa Herald", 1892.
 Central State Historic Archives of the Ukrainian SSR. Kyiv.
 Shevchenko, T. Documents and materials. Kyiv: Derzhpolitvydav URSR, 1963.
 Shevchenko, T. Complete collection of works in ten volumes. Kyiv: Academy of Sciences of the Ukrainian SSR, 1951-1964.
 Victor Pogadaev. Taras Shevchenko: Jubli ke-200. - in: Pentas, Jil. 9, Bil. 1 - Mac 2014. Kuala Lumpur: Istana Budaya, 45-49 (in Malay)
 Shevchenko, T. Kobzar (The Complete English Edition with Illustrations). London: Glagoslav Publications, 2013. ,  
 Zinaida Tulub. The Exile (Biographical fiction about Taras Shevchenko). London: Glagoslav Publications, 2015.

External links

 
 
 Shevchenko, Taras in the Encyclopedia of Ukraine
 Taras Shevchenko in the Library of Congress: A Bibliography 
 "Taras Shevchenko: Poet, Artist, Icon" (Video)
 
 Taras Shevchenko • Bard of Ukraine (biography by Dmytro Doroshenko)
 Shevchenko in English translations
 Interactive biography of Taras Shevchenko in various languages including English
 Poems by Taras Shevchenko for reading online in Ukrainian 
 Taras Shevchenko Museum of Canada
 Taras Shevchenko Museum of Canada—English Translations of the Poetry of Taras Shevchenko
 Self portraits of Taras Shevchenko 
 Shevchenko's paintings and Ukrainian art songs by Ukrainian composers on Shevchenko's poetry. Audio files.
 Taras Shevchenko Museum & Memorial Park Foundation
 Video Tour: Taras Shevchenko Museum in Toronto (Музей Тараса Шевченка, Торонто).
 Website dedicated to the Kobzar of Taras Shevchenko in English, with illustrations 
 Відповідь на молитву / Answer to prayer, short film by Maxim Neafit Bujnicki, 2009 in tribute to Shevchenko
 Drafts of the translation from Ukrainian of The Poetical Works of Taras Shevchenko are held in the Watson Kirkconnell fonds (R1847) at Library and Archives Canada

Monuments
 Infoukes.com —Shevchenko Monument In Oakville, ON, Canada
 Pbase—Shevchenko Monument in Palermo, Buenos Aires, Argentina.

 
1814 births
1861 deaths
People from Cherkasy Oblast
People from Kiev Governorate
Ukrainian people in the Russian Empire
Ukrainian democracy activists
Ukrainian nationalists
Ukrainian illustrators
Ukrainian poets
Ukrainian ethnographers
Ukrainian dramatists and playwrights
Dramatists and playwrights from the Russian Empire
Male writers from the Russian Empire
19th-century Ukrainian dramatists and playwrights
Ukrainian prisoners and detainees
Academic staff of the Taras Shevchenko National University of Kyiv
Brotherhood of Saints Cyril and Methodius members
Hromada (society) members
19th-century Ukrainian painters
19th-century Ukrainian male artists
Ukrainian male painters
Ukrainian exiles in the Russian Empire
Ukrainian dissidents
19th-century Ukrainian writers
Members of the Imperial Academy of Arts
Serfs